Grist (originally Grist Magazine; also referred to as Grist.org) is an American non-profit online magazine founded in 1999 that publishes environmental news and commentary. Grist's tagline is "Climate. Justice. Solutions." Grist is headquartered in Seattle, Washington, and has about 50 writers and employees. Its CEO is former state representative Brady Walkinshaw.

Coverage
Grist offers reporting, interviews, opinion pieces, daily news, book reviews, food and agricultural coverage, and green advice. Its stated mission is "show that a just and sustainable future is within reach."

Regular features include "Ask Umbra," an environmental advice column by Umbra Fisk. Grist also summarizes the day's environmentally related news events in daily and weekly email newsletters.

Main writers previously included David Roberts, Lisa Hymas, and Sarah Goodyear.

Staff 

Chip Giller is the founder and former president of Grist. Giller received the Heinz Award for founding Grist in 2009. In 2004, he received the Jane Bagley Lehman Award for Excellence in Public Advocacy, from the Tides Foundation in recognition of the role Grist is playing in increasing environmental awareness. Giller took first place in the 2001 AlterNet New Media Hero contest for his work on Grist and was one of five finalists for the Environmental Grantmakers Association's 2002 "Environmental Messenger of the Year Award." Giller was previously the editor of Greenwire, the first environmental news daily, and a reporter for High Country News, a biweekly newspaper covering Western environmental issues. 

Brady Walkinshaw, a former state representative from Seattle, was hired as Grist's CEO in March 2017. Walkinshaw unsuccessfully campaigned to represent the Washington's 7th congressional district in 2016 on a platform of controlling carbon emissions, among issues.

Finances 
Grist is registered as a non-profit 501C3 business entity.  For fiscal year 2011, Grist reported revenues of $3,700,490, expenses of $3,022,290, and total assets of $2,028,447.

Awards 

 Winner of 2020 Best Consumer Website by Folio (magazine)
 Two Grist journalists - Shannon Osaka and Zoya Teirstein - were selected as 2020 SEAL Environmental Journalism Award winners. 
Winner of 2018 Best Consumer Website by Folio (magazine)
 Winner of 2010 "Best of The Web" Award by Seattle Weekly for "Seattle's Best Online Presence - Environment/Green"
 Silver medal 2008 Independent Publisher Book Awards (IPPYs).  For the book "Wake Up and Smell the Planet"
 Winner of 2006 National Conservation Achievement Award from the National Wildlife Federation
 Winner of 2006 Webby People's Voice Award for best online magazine
 Winner of 2005 Utne Independent Press Award for online political coverage
 Winner of 2005 Webby People's Voice Award for best online magazine
 Nominated for a 2004 Utne Independent Press Award for online political coverage
 Winner of 2003 Utne Independent Press Award for online political coverage
 Winner of 2001 AlterNet New Media Hero contest 
 Society of Environmental Journalists named Grist a finalist for outstanding online coverage in the 1st Annual Awards for Reporting on the Environment
 Selected as "Cool Site of the Day" on November 18, 2004

See also 
 Environmental journalism
 List of environmental websites

References

Further reading

External links
 

1999 establishments in Washington (state)
American environmental websites
Environmental magazines
Magazines established in 1999
Magazines published in Seattle
Online magazines published in the United States
Political magazines published in the United States